George Montagu, Duke of Montagu KG, PC, FRS (26 July 1712 – 23 May 1790) styled Lord Brudenell until 1732 and known as The Earl of Cardigan between 1732 and 1766, was a British peer.

Background and education
He was born George Brudenell at Cardigan House, Lincoln's Inn Fields, in London, the eldest son of George Brudenell, 3rd Earl of Cardigan, and his wife Lady Elizabeth Bruce, daughter of Thomas Bruce, 3rd Earl of Elgin. He was baptised on 1 August 1712 at St Giles-in-the-Fields. He was the elder brother of James Brudenell, 5th Earl of Cardigan, the Honourable Robert Brudenell and Thomas Brudenell-Bruce, 1st Earl of Ailesbury. He matriculated at Queen's College, Oxford, on 1 July 1726 and graduated from there on 31 January 1729 with a Master of Arts degree.

Public life

Brudenell succeeded his father in the earldom in 1732. In 1742 he was appointed Justice in Eyre north of the Trent, a post he held until 1752. He inherited the estates of his father-in-law, the 2nd and last Duke of Montagu (see below), in 1749, and assumed the surname "Montagu" for himself and his children on 15 July 1749. In 1752 he was made a Knight of the Garter and made Constable and Governor of Windsor Castle, which he remained until his death. In the 1750s he was a president of St Luke's Hospital for Lunatics. In 1766 he was created Marquess of Monthermer and Duke of Montagu, revivals of the titles which had become extinct on his father-in-law's death.

His only son, John Montagu, Marquess of Monthermer, had been created a peer in his own right in 1762 as Baron Montagu of Boughton, but died unmarried in 1770, and, with no male heirs, Montagu was created Baron Montagu of Boughton, of Boughton in the County of Northampton, in 1776, with a special remainder to the younger sons of his daughter Elizabeth, who had married Henry Scott, 3rd Duke of Buccleuch. He was sworn of the Privy Council the same year. He later served as Master of the Horse from 1780 to 1790 and as Lord Lieutenant of Huntingdonshire from 1789 to 1790.

Family

Montagu married Lady Mary Montagu, daughter of John Montagu, 2nd Duke of Montagu (of the first creation), on 7 July 1730 at St Giles-in-the-Fields. They had two children who survived infancy:

John Montagu, Marquess of Monthermer and 1st Baron Montagu of Boughton (18 March 1735–11 April 1770)
Lady Elizabeth Montagu (29 May 1743– 21 November 1827), who married Henry Scott, 3rd Duke of Buccleuch and had issue.

The Duchess of Montagu died in May 1775. The Duke of Montagu died at Privy Gardens, Whitehall, London, in May 1790, aged 77, without surviving male issue. The marquessate and dukedom became extinct, the earldom of Cardigan and its associated titles passed to his brother, Lord Brudenell, and the barony of Montagu passed to his grandson, Lord Henry Scott (who assumed the surname "Montagu-Scott", and on whose death the barony became extinct).

References

|-

1712 births
1790 deaths
201
Earls of Cardigan
Fellows of the Royal Society
Knights of the Garter
Lord-Lieutenants of Huntingdonshire
Members of the Privy Council of Great Britain
People from Camden Town
George
Barons Montagu of Boughton